Benjamin Williamson may refer to:

 Ben Williamson (English footballer) (born 1988), English footballer who plays for National League club Eastleigh
 Benjamin Williamson (mathematician) (1827–1916), Irish mathematician who was a Fellow of Trinity College Dublin
 Benjamin Williamson (political advisor), served as deputy assistant to President Donald Trump and senior adviser to Chief of Staff Mark Meadows
 Benjamin Michael Williamson (Event Manager and musician), AKA BWilly is an English DJ from Manchester with tracks Such as Rabbit in a Hat.

See also
 Ben Williamson (disambiguation)